Fort Lugard  is a fort and a museum in Kampala Uganda which was the colonial administrative site. The fort was occupied by the Buganda Kingdom before President Amin Donated the Land to the Uganda Muslim Supreme Council .

Location 
The fort is Located a long Old Kampala Road on old Kampala Hill opp. Old Kampala Primary School close to the Uganda national Mosque. The coordinates of Fort Lugard are 0.3170472364181185N, 32.56789748465698E(Latitude:0.3170472364181185, Longitude: 32.56789748465698).

History 
In 1908, the first museum was said to have been opened at Fort Lugard. In Museum was moved from Fort Lugard to Makerere in 1942. Fort Lugard was established by Sir Frederick Lugard who was said to have been the first colonial administrator in the year 1890. Lugard was a British soldier, African explorer and colonial administrator. From December 26, 1890 to May 1892, the Imperial British East African Company(IBECO) sent him to Uganda as a military administrator. It was at this fort where Lugard raised the British flag, Union Jack, as a sign that Uganda had become a British Protectorate. For several years, the fort was the headquarters for the colonial administration. It was standing on about 12 acres and it was reduced to 10 acres then 50 by 40 meters. The fort was severely destroyed during the construction of 15,000 seater Uganda National mosque by Uganda Muslim Supreme Council after President Idi Amin donating the land to them.

See also 
Uganda Museum

References

External links 
 Fort Lugard

Government buildings completed in 1908
Buildings and structures in Kampala
1908 establishments in the British Empire